Barbara Parsons Lane (born 1940s) is an American writer. She won a PEN/Newman's Own First Amendment Award.

Life 
In 1997, she was convicted of manslaughter.  She participated in a prison writing class by Wally Lamb, which was banned and later reinstated. In 2005, she was released on parole.

Works 

 Couldn't Keep It to Myself: Testimonies from our Imprisoned Sisters , 2003

References 

Living people
1940s births
American writers